The 2019–20 Magyar Kupa (English: Hungarian Cup) was the 80th season of Hungary's annual knock-out cup football competition. The title holders were MOL Vidi FC by winning the 2019 Magyar Kupa Final. The competition was postponed on 16 March 2020 due to the COVID-19 pandemic and resumed on 23 May. Honvéd won the final by beating Mezőkövesdi SE at the Puskás Aréna.

Main Tournament
On 11 September 2019 the draw took place at the headquarters of the Hungarian Football Federation. This was the first draw in the 2019–20 season where Nemzeti Bajnokság I and Nemzeti Bajnokság II clubs were included.

Participating teams

1: The license from Balmazújváros was not issued. Therefore, the club could not take part in the 2019–20 Magyar Kupa.

Round of 128
A total of 128 teams participated in the 6th round of the Magyar Kupa. The new entrants were 12 clubs from the 2019–20 Nemzeti Bajnokság I, 20 clubs from the 2019–20 Nemzeti Bajnokság II, and 48 from the 2019–20 Nemzeti Bajnokság III.

Round of 64

Round of 32

Round of 16

1st leg

2nd leg

Quarter-finals

1st leg

2nd leg

Semi finals
On 18 May 2020, it was announced that Honvéd would host MTK Budapest FC at the Puskás Aréna.

1st leg

2nd leg

Final

The final was played at the Puskás Aréna in which 10,000 spectators were seated following strict regulations after COVID-19 pandemic.

Top goalscorers

See also
 2019–20 Nemzeti Bajnokság I
 2019–20 Nemzeti Bajnokság II
 2019–20 Nemzeti Bajnokság III

References

External links
 Official site 
 soccerway.com

Cup
Hungary
Magyar Kupa seasons